Branislav Mićić (born 17 April 1990 Loznica) is a Swiss professional footballer of Serbian descent who is currently with FC Aesch having previously been with Scottish Premiership club Ross County.

Ross County 
Micic signed for Ross County on 31 January 2013 on a six-month contract. He was handed his debut as a substitute during the 2–2 draw with St Johnstone on 21 April 2013, picking up a yellow card in the progress.

It was confirmed on 21 May 2013 that Micic had been handed a contract extension as a reward for the fifth-placed finish in the SPL.

On 31 January 2014, Micic left Ross County by mutual consent

References

External links

1990 births
Living people
Sportspeople from Loznica
Swiss men's footballers
Swiss expatriate footballers
Swiss people of Serbian descent
Expatriate footballers in Scotland
Ross County F.C. players
Scottish Premier League players
Scottish Professional Football League players
Association football defenders